Magnolia dandyi is a species of plant in the family Magnoliaceae. It is native to north Vietnam, Laos and China where it occurs in the Yunnan and Guangxi provinces. It is threatened by habitat loss.

References

 The Plant List

Flora of China
dandyi
Vulnerable plants
Taxonomy articles created by Polbot